This Is Pat DiNizio is the second solo album by Pat DiNizio of The Smithereens, released in 2006 by Fuel 2000. The album features DiNizio accompanied by jazz pianist Jay Rowe interpreting songs from mainly the 1960s.

Background
This Is Pat DiNizio is inspired and influenced by the 1975 vocal-piano album The Tony Bennett/Bill Evans Album, on which singer Tony Bennett and pianist Bill Evans interprets The Great American Songbook. "I really loved the record", Pat DiNizio explained. "I loved the challenge of it, because it’s just the naked solo human voice with one instrument. ... I wanted to do something similar, which was to do standards of my generation". With a few exceptions, most of the songs recorded for This Is Pat DiNizio are "songs that our generation grew up listening to firsthand when they were initially released", DiNizio wrote in the album's liner notes.

The album was recorded at Hollingsworth House, DiNizio's home in Scotch Plains, New Jersey, and all vocal and piano tracks are one-take, unedited performances with no overdubs.

Critical reception

AllMusic's Mark Deming rated the album 3½ stars out of 5, saying that pianist Jay Rowe handles the melodies in a tasteful and elegant manner, and that DiNizio's phrasing is intelligent and well-considered. Deming felt that the "naturally moody tone" of DiNizio's vocals tends to favor the blue side of the song selection, which works well on certain songs but doesn't quite fit the material on others. He concluded that "DiNizio has both the pipes and the musical sense to make this sort of project work", and that the album was "a very pleasant surprise".

Releases
The album was originally available through Pat DiNizio's website in a limited edition of 500 copies as a 3-disc set in 2005, but was quickly snapped up by Fuel 2000 for a single CD release in May 2006. In March 2012, Fuel 2000 released an expanded edition of the album with a slightly different track listing and a second disc of bonus tracks. A limited edition vinyl release followed in July 2012, released by The Great American Music Company.

Track listing

2012 expanded edition
Released 20 March 2012, this 2-disc edition includes the original 18-track album with a different track listing and a second CD of bonus tracks. The songs "Blue Period" and "Behind the Wall of Sleep" from the original edition have been replaced with "How Can I Be Sure?" and "Anyone Who Had a Heart". "Blue Period", though, is included on the second CD.

Disc One

Disc Two

2012 vinyl edition
This Is Pat DiNizio  was also issued as a limited edition LP in July 2012. The vinyl edition included the song "September Song", which was not included on either of the two previous CD releases.

Personnel
Musicians
Pat DiNizio – vocals, acoustic guitar (expanded edition disc two, tracks 1–9) 
Jay Rowe – piano (except expanded edition disc two, tracks 1–9, 13), electric piano (expanded edition disc two, track 13) 
Technical
Pat DiNizio – producer, engineer
Rich Lamb – mixing

References

External links
 Smooth Views: The sidemen of smooth jazz

2006 albums
Vocal–instrumental duet albums
Covers albums
Fuel 2000 albums